Josh Fleming may refer to:
 Josh Fleming (baseball) (born 1996), American baseball pitcher
 Josh Fleming (cricketer) (born 1989), English cricketer